Grant is an unincorporated community and census-designated place (CDP) in Beaverhead County, Montana, United States.

Grant was first listed as a CDP prior to the 2020 census.

Demographics

References 

Census-designated places in Beaverhead County, Montana
Census-designated places in Montana